The Hydra Trophy is the trophy awarded to the Women's Flat Track Derby Association (WFTDA) team that wins the WFTDA Championship Tournament at the conclusion of every WFTDA roller derby season.

Named in honor of Hydra, founding member of the WFTDA and first president of the association, the Hydra Trophy was first presented to the 2008 champions at the Northwest Knockdown in Portland, Oregon.

Winners
Since its creation, the Hydra Trophy has been awarded eight times, with the Gotham Girls Roller Derby All-Stars winning five times, including a four-year run from 2011-2014.

 

Before the Hydra Trophy:

References

Women's Flat Track Derby Association
Awards established in 2008
American sports trophies and awards